Michael Bernard Foley (born 3 December 1946) is a former Australian politician and member of the Tasmanian Greens.

Foley was born in Boronia, Victoria.

In 1995, he was elected to the Tasmanian House of Assembly for Franklin in a recount resulting from the resignation of Gerry Bates. He held the seat until his defeat in 1998.

After politics, Foley has been head of the Far South Wilderness Centre.

References

1946 births
Living people
Australian Greens members of the Parliament of Tasmania
Members of the Tasmanian House of Assembly
Politicians from Melbourne
People from Boronia, Victoria